The Centrolew (Center-Left) was a coalition of several Polish political parties (Polish People's Party "Wyzwolenie", German Socialist Labour Party of Poland, Polish People's Party "Piast", National Workers' Party, Polish Socialist Party and Christian-democratic parties) after the 1928 Sejm elections.  The coalition was directed against Józef Piłsudski and the Sanation government.

To counter the Centrolew, prior to the 1930 Sejm elections, Centrolew politicians were subjected to repressions (most famously, imprisonment in the Brest Fortress, and the subsequent Brest trials). The Centrolew was defeated in the elections and broke up as a coalition.

References

Defunct political party alliances in Poland
Political parties established in 1928
1928 establishments in Poland
Political parties disestablished in 1930